Blaxland County is one of the 141 Cadastral divisions of New South Wales. It is bounded to the south by the Lachlan River and a small part of Waverley Creek. It includes Mount Hope and the Nombinnie Nature Reserve.

Blaxland County was named in honour of John Blaxland, landowner and merchant.

Parishes within this county
A full list of parishes found within this county; their current LGA and mapping coordinates to the approximate centre of each location is as follows:

(*) The Parish of Illewong should not be confused with the former mining village of Illewong, nearer to Cobar, in the neighbouring Robinson County.

References

Counties of New South Wales